Soaserana is a town and commune in Madagascar. It belongs to the district of Manja, which is a part of Menabe Region. The population of the commune was estimated to be approximately 11,000 in 2001 commune census.

Only primary schooling is available. The majority 98% of the population of the commune are farmers, while an additional 2% receives their livelihood from raising livestock. The most important crops are rice and onions; also lima beans are an important agricultural product.

References and notes 

Populated places in Menabe